Heminghu is a town of Lindian County in western Heilongjiang province, China, located about  northwest of the county seat along G10 Suifenhe–Manzhouli Expressway. , it has 12 villages and 1 fishery under its administration.

Before 2015 it was known as Sanhe Township.

See also 
 List of township-level divisions of Heilongjiang

References 

Township-level divisions of Heilongjiang
Lindian County